The Exchange is an a cappella band from the United States founded in 2012 by Rochester, NY native Aaron Sperber. The group consists of Aaron Sperber, Alfredo Austin, Christopher Diaz, Jamal Moore, and Richard Steighner. The band was a finalist on Season 5 of NBC's musical reality television show "The Sing-Off" and also performed as the Backstreet Boys' opening act during the 2014 “In a World Like This” European tour.

Sperber, Moore, and Steighner were also each contestants on Season 3 of "The Sing-Off". Sperber and Moore competed with the University of Rochester YellowJackets while Steighner was a member of Denver, Colorado based group Urban Method.  Diaz served in a coaching role on the show.

Get Ready

After an initial series of performances in 2012, in January 2013 The Exchange released their first album. Titled ‘Get Ready’, the album is entirely a cappella and primarily a cover album, featuring 9 cover tracks and 1 original track by member Christopher Diaz. Following the release of ‘Get Ready’, the group embarked on an international tour that included performances in the United Kingdom, Australia, Hong Kong, Taiwan, Austria, Germany, and Switzerland.

“The Good Fight” and Backstreet Boys Tour 

In February 2014, The Exchange released their first all original album titled “The Good Fight”. The Good Fight was the second album released by The Exchange. The album marked The Exchange's departure from purely a cappella music to music featuring vocals over tracked instruments. The EP features 6 original songs. Days after the release of “The Good Fight” album, The Exchange served as the opening act for the European leg of the Backstreet Boys In a World Like This Tour.

The Sing-Off (Season 5) & Sing-Off Live Tour

In December 2014 The Exchange appeared on Season 5 of NBC’s “The Sing-Off”. The band finished as finalists behind the Vanderbilt Melodores. Following their appearance on NBC’s “The Sing-Off”, the band partook in The Sing-Off Live Tour. Joining The Exchange on the tour was Voice Play of The Sing-Off (season 4) and Street Corner Symphony of The Sing-Off (season 2). The tour was also featured on a live stream concert hosted by Yahoo! Live.

"Pursuit"

Released March 1, 2015, Pursuit is The Exchange’s third album.  Pursuit is entirely a cappella, featuring 6 covers and 1 original song written by band members Alfredo Austin and Jamal Moore.

Discography

Get Ready - 2013

The Good Fight - EP - 2014

Single Release: Kerosene (Party Remix) - 2014

The "party remix" version of Kerosene, Track 3 from the group's second EP release The Good Fight, was produced by The Exchange and Rick Markowitz, and mixed by Paul Kaleka.  This version of the track is a more upbeat take on the song.

Pursuit - 2015

References

American pop music groups
American boy bands